Nahla Valley is a geographic region located in the province of Dohuk in the Akre District, Kurdistan Region of Iraq. The Sapna valley lies to the northwest and is separated by a mountain range, and the city of Akre is to the south, separated by another mountain range. It is bound by the Greater Zab River to the north and east, and the Khazir River to the west.

History

Most of the Assyrians living in Nahla, which number around 20,000, moved there from Hakkari after the Assyrian genocide that occurred during the First World War. However, some villages were emptied in the 1960s when fights between the Iraqi government and Kurdish separatists forced most of their inhabitants to flee to Baghdad and Mosul. Some scarcely populated villages were completely destroyed later on during the Anfal campaign in the 1980s as well. The population of the valley grew considerably following the Iraq War, as many Assyrians living in Dora and Mosul started settling back in the region.

There is significant friction between the Kurds and Assyrians in the valley, with a history of violence, land squatting, and voter suppression since the establishment of Kurdistan Region. On July 17, 1999, an armed group belonging to the Assyrian Bethnahrin National Council attacked a PDK Peshmerga position in the region in retaliation for the murder of an Assyrian woman. The attack resulted in 39 deaths and 20 injured on the Kurdish side.

See also
Duhok
Barwari
Hakkari
Sapna Valley
List of Assyrian settlements

References 

Dahuk Governorage, Iraqi American Chamber of Commerce
KDP Blockades, Attacks Assyrian Village, AINA.org

Plains of Iraq
Assyrian geography
Dohuk Governorate
Nineveh Governorate
Geography of Iraqi Kurdistan